Adgestone is a small hamlet on the Isle of Wight. It is located close to Brading (where the 2011 Census was included) in the east of the island.

There is  vineyard in Adgestone which also is the site of a bed and breakfast. This is one of the oldest vineyards in the British Islands, having been started in 1968.

There is a campsite in Adgestone. The nearest public transport is bus route 3 on the main road through Brading.

References

External links 
 
 

Hamlets on the Isle of Wight
Brading